Stanley Harris may refer to:

Bucky Harris (1896–1977), Major League Baseball player, manager and executive
Stanley S. Harris (born 1927), former United States federal judge
Stanley Harris (footballer) (1881–1926), English footballer and cricketer
Stan Harris (1894–1973), all-round sportsman, in rugby union, water polo, tennis and boxing
Stan Harris (field hockey) (born 1934), American Olympic hockey player
Stan Harris (Australian footballer) (1909–1964), Australian rules footballer